Hakim Syed Khaleefathullah is an Indian physician and the founder of Niamath Science Academy, known for his scholarship and expertise in the alternative medicine system of Unani. He was honoured by the Government of India, in 2014, with the Padma Shri, the fourth highest Indian civilian award, for his contribution to the field of medicine.

Biography

Syed Khaleefathullah was born in 1938, in Chennai, the capital city of the south Indian state of Tamil Nadu. He studied Unani in the traditional way, and started his medical practice in Chennai. In 1985, he founded Niamath Science Academy, an NGO in memory of the renowned Unani physician, Dr. Hakim Syed Niamathullah, for promoting the Unani medicine system.

Syed has published several books on Unani medicine. He has also attended many conferences and seminars in India and abroad, the International Conference on Eastern and Western Approaches to Healing, conducted at San Francisco, USA in 1985, The Second International Conference on Elements in Health and Diseases, held in Karachi, Pakistan in 1987, International Workshop on Health and Illness in Venice, Italy in 1988 and Parliament of World Religions at Chicago, USA in 1993 being some of them.

Khaleefathullah lives in Chennai. His son, Dr. Syed M. M. Ameen, follows the foot steps of his father and is a locally known Unani physician.

Positions
Hakim Khaleefathullah was the Honorary Physician to President of India from 1987 to 1991. He serves as the Member of the Governing Body of the Central Council for Research in Unani Medicine, New Delhi and is also the Chairman of its Clinical Research subcommittee. He was a Member of the Ayurvedic, Siddha and Unani Drugs Technical Advisory Board, Government of India  and holds many other positions.
 Professor - Government Unani Medical College, Chennai
 President, Central Council of Indian Medicine (1984-1995)
 Vice President - Unani Committee of the Central Council of Indian Medicine
 Member, Governing Body, National Institute of Unani Medicine, Bangalore (1986-1997)
 Founder member and Chairman, Executive Board, Central Council for Research in Unani Medicine - Government of India(1996-1999)
 Member of the Central Council for Health and Family Welfare (1999-2001)
 Chairman, Unani Pharmacopoeia Committee, Ministry of Health and Family Welfare, Government of India (1998-2002)
 Founder Director - Central Council of Research in Unani Medicine (CCRUM) -

Awards and recognitions
The Government of India honoured Hakim Syed Khaleefathullah with the Padma Shri award, in 2014, in recognition of his services to the society. The Tamil Nadu Dr. M. G. R. Medical University has instituted a gold medal, in his honour, awarded to the best outgoing student in the discipline of the Bachelor of Unani Medicine and Surgery (BUMS). The other awards and honours received by Dr. Khaleefathullah are:

 Doctor of Science (Honoris Causa) - Tamil Nadu Dr. M. G. R. Medical University - 1998
 Baba-e-Tibb - 1989
 Hakim-e-Millath - 1990
 Physician of the year Gold Medal and Citation - 1990
 Bharat Bishaq Ratna - 1995
 Hakim Ahmed Ashraf Memorial Global Award - 2009, awarded by Hakim Ahmed Ashraf Memorial Society,  Hyderabad

See also
 Unani

References

Further reading

External links
 
 

1938 births
Living people
Recipients of the Padma Shri in medicine
20th-century Indian medical doctors
Medical doctors from Chennai
Unani practitioners
Indian medical writers